

Ealhmund was a medieval Bishop of Winchester. He was consecrated between 801 and 803. He died between 805 and 814.

Citations

References

External links
 

Bishops of Winchester
9th-century English bishops

8th-century births
9th-century deaths
Year of birth unknown
Year of death uncertain